The Serbian Journalists' Association Building is in Belgrade, in the territory of the city municipality of Vračar. It was built in 1934, and it represents an immovable cultural property as a cultural monument.

Background 

The Serbian Journalists' Association building was erected in 1934 in Vračar in Belgrade in 28, Resavska Street, as a project of the Croatian architect Ernest Weissman (1904–1985). It was officially opened on 7 April 1935.

Description

It is one of the most modern buildings in Belgrade, implemented in the spirit of modern architecture, built of reinforced concrete, brick, iron and glass. It is conceived as an extremely modern business and residential building of cubic form, interpolated into a series of adjacent objects. Its spatial organization applied several elements of Corbusier free plan, with a liquid, flexible and functionally interchangeable space with a spacious club room on the ground floor. The glazed circular staircase, in the spirit of the constructivist-functionalist doctrine, drawn into a vertical rectangular concrete frame with rectangular loggias, was a very innovative motif in the Belgrade architecture of the time. The facade of the journalists' house is smooth, without ornaments and zone divisions, based on the axis of symmetry and highlighting the main motif. The flat facade is accentuated by the free poles on the ground floor, horizontal floors and accented by a final withdrawn storey.

Significance
In the scientific and publicizing historiography of Serbian architecture from its erection until today, the house stands out as the most consistent example of early Belgrade functionalistic architecture, and as the cleanest monument of modern architecture from the first half of the fourth decade of the last century, which lead it to be declared a cultural monument. in 1997.

The Journalists' House is one of the most significant buildings in Belgrade conceived in a modern spirit. In addition to its architectural value, it is important as a meeting place for journalists, publicists, writers and prominent personalities from the cultural life of Serbia.

See also

• List of cultural monuments in Belgrade

• Serbian Journalists' Association

Sources

External links 
 Republic Institute for the Protection of Cultural Monuments – Belgrade
 Republic Institute for the Protection of Cultural Monuments-Belgrade/Immovable cultural property base
 List of monuments

Protected Monuments of Culture
Buildings and structures in Belgrade
Event venues in Serbia
Concrete buildings and structures
Commercial buildings completed in 1934
Commercial buildings in Serbia
Mixed-use developments
Residential buildings in Serbia
1934 establishments in Yugoslavia
Apartment buildings
Vračar